Aarno Turpeinen (21 March 1971 – 8 June 2022) was a Finnish professional footballer who played as a defender.

Honours
HJK
 Veikkausliiga: 1997, 2002, 2003
 Finnish Cup: 1996, 1998, 2000, 2003

Citations

References
 Veikkausliigan verkkonäyttely 

1971 births
2022 deaths
Sportspeople from Oulu
Finnish footballers
Association football defenders
Finland international footballers
Veikkausliiga players
Oulun Työväen Palloilijat players
FC Oulu players
Rovaniemen Palloseura players
Helsingin Jalkapalloklubi players